Capulus subcompressus is a species of small sea snail, a marine gastropod mollusk in the family Capulidae, the cap snails.

Distribution
This species occurs in the Weddell Sea, off Antarctica

Description 
The maximum recorded shell length is 6.6 mm.

Habitat 
Minimum recorded depth is 283 m. Maximum recorded depth is 430 m.

References

External links
 

Capulidae
Gastropods described in 1903